Dāwaṛ is a Karlani Pashtun tribe mostly inhabiting North Waziristan in the Khyber Pakhtunkhwa province of Pakistan. The Dawaris inhabit the Tochi Valley and speak the Dawari dialect of Pashto.

History
The Dawars originally lived in the Shawal area, which lies partly in the present-day North Waziristan tribal agency of Pakistan and partly in the Paktika Province of Afghanistan. The Dawars are descended from the Shitak supertribe of the Pashtuns. Dawars are descend from the Shitaks. In the 14th century, the Wazirs another Pashtun tribe, who were living in Birmal in the west, migrated eastwards to the Shawal area and fell into dispute with the Shitaks  and succeeded to oust the Shitaks northeastwards. Eventually, the Dawari Shitaks settled in the Tochi Valley in the modern-day North Wazisitan. At the beginning of the twentieth century the tribe had some 5,200 fighting men.

Dawari, or usually Alizai along with Waziris and other pashtun tribes upraises caused in southern and south west zone deteriorating of Kabul government and revolutions in the country, in Abdalee (Durrani) Empire they had the most powerful participation in their success and army contribution. Their location along the fertile land meant they were prone to fevers and other ravaging diseases that are bred in the wet sodden lands of the Tochi Valley, lying at the bottom of a deep depression exposed to the burning rays of the sun. The effects of these ailments may be clearly traced in the drawn or bloated features and the shrunken or swollen limbs of nearly every Dawari that has passed middle life. Mostly they have been at war in the past with their neighbouring Wazir tribe, mostly over land and blood feuds.

Location
Although they are surrounded on all four sides by a Waziri population they bear little resemblance to the Waziris. They are an agricultural people whilst the Waziris are a pastoral race, and they are much richer than their neighbours. They thrive on a rich sedimentary soil copiously irrigated in the midst of a country where cultivable land of any kind is scarce and water in general hardly to be obtained.

Dawari: A previous romantic and historical place named Zamindawar located in northern side of Helmand province between Kajaki and Musa Qala Districts, previously named by 360 Kariz (Shah Kariz) totally covered by Alizai tribe.
Due to its name most of the local people are called Dawari who have very special morals and specialities from other places, Including its thousands years remnant historical signs Zamindawar has an old city (Deh-e-Baba) (Zoor Shaar) which was the empire capital in the eras of Ghori, Sori and other empires because of its fresh weather, tasty fruits, and natural scenery which attracts the attention of the sightseers and excursionists which is still remnant on its old, as well as today's bashfulness, ambitions and bravery of people reveal the image of its thousands years old history.

It should not be remnant that writing some names here representing the area like: Alhaj Mola Mohammed Naseem Akhond the Defence Minister of Mujahedin's government, Alhaj Mula Ghafaar Akhond Governor of Helmand Province, Alhaj Mola Mohammed Rasool Akhund governor of Helmand province, Mohammed Afzal khan a genius, gentle, bashful and popular tribal khan (leader), Mohammed Zahir (solamal) the former Deputy Defence Minister of Afghanistan and Abdul Rauf Benawa the most popular shining star in the sky of literature and poetry who worked as director of Pashto Cultural Society, Minister of Information and Culture, Poet of the country's national anthem who is still alive, Abdul Karim Haqqani the Former leader of the Ulasi Jirga in Sardaar Mohammed Daud Khan's Republic Government.

Education

The Dawars are the most educated people in the North Waziristan Agency. Today people are more educated, however Dawari people don't compromise on religion or honour, although attempts are being made to reduce gun culture.  As a result, many more people are now found in every field. Tochi river is the beauty throughout of DAWAR regions. The people living in villages nearer to the Tochi river have a prosperous and healthy life. The people play games in the Tochi river daily after the Asar prayer. More specifically, football and cricket have been played. In the holy month of Ramadan, the people delay the game until the end of fasting. Of interest to tourists are the village "Barokhel cheena", enjoy the asr time in tochi, fasting, and iftar preparation. There are many boy's schools but few schools for girls. GOVT High Hurmaz including some others in Miransha still provides education to the metric level. Private schools on the other hand are more suitable for English education. While in Miranshah Tehsil there are Postgraduate College for boys and Government Degree college for Girls. The Girls of Dawar families are mostly educated and they have very sound trun out during elections. Their women participated in Election, Education, Medical fields and other technical line. Due to literate brother, husband and father the girls are not getting early married.

Notable Dawars 
 Shaheed Gen Shudikhel Dawar
 Mohsin Dawar
 Noor Islam Dawar
 Tahir Dawar
  Sharif Ullah Dawar

References 

Karlani Pashtun tribes
Pashto-language surnames
Pakistani names